Themba (Nomathemba female) is a South African name meaning faith. This term is often used in a Godly manner. In the Christian bible for an example, the Lord of Lords Christ Jesus used to use this term for someone who had an exceptional way of speaking and doing for the Glory of God. Notable people with the name include:
Given or middle name
Themba Dlamini (born 1950), Prime Minister of Swaziland 
Themba Godi (born 1966), South African politician 
Themba Mabaso, director of South Africa Bureau of Heraldry
Themba Maseko (born 1961), South African politician
Themba N. Masuku, regional administrator of Swaziland 
Themba Matanzima, South African Army officer 
Themba Mnguni (born 1973), South African football player 
Themba Muata-Marlow (born 1994), Australian/English football defender of Jamaican ancestry 
Themba Ndaba, South African Actor and director
Themba Ndlovu, Zimbabwean football defender
Themba Nkabinde, South African Army General Officer 
Themba Nkozi, South African techno and house music DJ and producer
Alfred Themba Qabula (1942–2002), South African poet, writer and trade unionist
Themba Sukude (born 1974), South African serial killer
Themba Vilakazi (born 1981–1982), South African serial killer 
Themba Zwane (born 1989), South African football midfielder 

Surname
Can Themba (1924–1968), South African short-story writer

See also
The Themba Development Project, a Canadian non-profit organization